Karl Wolfgang Deutsch (21 July 1912 – 1 November 1992) was a social and political scientist from Prague. He was a professor at MIT, Yale University and Harvard University, as well as Director of WZB Berlin Social Science Center.

An influential 20th century social scientist, Deutsch studied war and peace, nationalism, co-operation, and communication, as well as pioneered quantitative methods and formal system analysis and model-thinking into the field of political and social sciences, contributing to the development of sociological liberalism school in international relations.

Early life

Born into a German-speaking Jewish family in Prague on 21 July 1912 when the city was part of the Austro-Hungarian Empire, Deutsch became a citizen of Czechoslovakia after World War I. His mother Maria was a Social Democrat, and one of the first women to be elected to the Czechoslovak parliament in 1920. His father Martin Moritz Deutsch owned an optical shop on Prague's Wenceslas Square and was also active in the Czechoslovak Social Democratic Worker's Party. His uncle Julius Deutsch was an important political leader in the Social Democratic Party of Austria.

Education
Karl studied law at the German University of Prague, where he graduated in 1934. He discontinued further studies as his overt anti-Nazi stance caused opposition by pro-Nazi students. Karl married his wife Ruth Slonitz in 1936, and after spending two years in England returned to Prague where due to his former anti-Nazi activities, he could not return to the German University. He instead joined its Czech counterpart, the Charles University, where he obtained a law degree in international and canon law and a PhD in Political Sciences in 1938.

Emigration and career
In 1938 following the Munich Agreement allowing German troops to enter the Sudetenland, he and his wife did not return from a trip to the United States. In 1939 Deutsch obtained a scholarship to carry out advanced studies at Harvard University where he received a second PhD in political science in 1951. His dissertation, Nationalism and Social Communication, was awarded Harvard’s Sumner Prize in 1951.

During World War II he worked for the Office of Strategic Services and participated in the San Francisco conference that resulted in the creation of the United Nations in 1945. Deutsch taught at several universities; first at MIT from 1943 to 1956 (he became a professor of history and political science at MIT in 1952); then at Yale University (initially as a visiting professor in 1957 before becoming a permanent professor in 1958) until 1967; and again at Harvard until 1982. He became a professor at Harvard in 1967, becoming Stanfield Professor of International Peace at Harvard in 1971, a position he held until his death. At Yale University, Deutsch developed the Yale Political Data Program, which collected quantitative indicators for theory testing.

Deutsch worked extensively on cybernetics, on the application of simulation and system dynamics models to the study of social, political, and economic problems, known as wicked problems. He built upon earlier efforts at world modeling such as those advanced and advocated by authors of the Club of Rome such as Limits to Growth by Donella Meadows, et al. (1972). He introduced new concepts such as security community to the literature.

He held several other prestigious positions; he was a member of the board of World Society Foundation in Zürich, Switzerland from 1984 onwards. He was also elected President of the American Political Science Association in 1969, of the International Political Science Association in 1976, and of the Society for General Systems Research in 1983. From 1977 to 1987, he was Director of the Social Science Research Center Berlin (Wissenschaftszentrum Berlin für Sozialforschung, WZB) in Berlin.

Karl W. Deutsch in his book The Nerves of Government: Models of Political Communication and Control hypothesized about “information elites, controlling means of mass communication and, accordingly, power institutions, the functioning of which is based on the use of information in their activities.”

Personal life
He died in Cambridge, Massachusetts, on 1 November 1992. He has two daughters, and three grandchildren.

See also 
 Transactionalism
 Karl Deutsch Award by International Political Science Association
 Karl Deutsch Award by International Studies Association

Selected publications 
 Nationalism and Social Communication , 1953, 1966 — from a dissertation at Harvard, published by MIT Press.
The Nerves of Government: Models of Political Communication and Control (1966), 
Arms Control and the Atlantic Alliance (1967),  
Nationalism and its Alternatives (1969), 
Problems of World Modeling: Political and Social Implications (1977), Published by HarperCollins Publishers. 
The Analysis of International Relations (1978), by Prentice-Hall, 
Tides Among Nations (1979), 
Politics and Government (1980), published by Houghton-Mifflin, 
Comparative Government: Politics of Industrialized and Developing Nations (1981), Published by Houghton Mifflin. 
Voyage of the Mind, 1930–1980 an autobiographical sketch.
 “Karl W. Deutsch: Pioneer in the Theory of International Relations” - With a Preface by Charles Lewis Taylor and Bruce M. Russett | Charles Lewis Taylor | Springerhttps://www.springer.com/gp/book/9783319029092

References

Further reading
 Utter, Glenn H.  and Charles Lockhart, eds. American Political Scientists: A Dictionary (2nd ed. 2002) pp 83–84,  online.
 Politik mit wachen Sinnen betreiben! Eine Erinnerung an Karl W. Deutsch (1912–1992). mit Beiträgen von Volker Hauff, Dieter Senghaas und Charles L. Taylor WZB-Vorlesungen 4. (pdf) 2003, Berlin. WZB-Mitteilungen 99 · März 2003.
 Back cover of book Problemas para el modelo del mundo (Spanish edition, 1990, of Karl W. Deutsch (editor). 1977. Problems of world modelling). Universidad Externado de Colombia, Fondo Cultural CEREC, 1990. Bogotá, Colombia.
 Kristof, Nicholas D. "The Best Political Scientist in the World Goes on Half-Time, Still an Optimist". The Harvard Crimson, 23 May 1979.
 Karl W. Deutsch special section in the Czech Sociological Review Articles on K.W. Deutsch by Miroslav Hroch, Andrei S. Markovits, Dieter Senghaas, Charles L. Taylor and Peter J. Katzenstein in the Czech Sociological Review 6 / 2012 on the occasion of the centenary of his birth.

1912 births
1992 deaths
Writers from Prague
Charles University alumni
Harvard Graduate School of Arts and Sciences alumni
Czech Jews
Czech political scientists
Scholars of nationalism
Harvard University faculty
Czechoslovak emigrants to the United States
International Political Science Association scholars
Presidents of the International Society for the Systems Sciences
20th-century political scientists